Diplokeleba is a genus of flowering plants belonging to the family Sapindaceae.

Its native range is Bolivia to Northeastern Argentina.

Species:

Diplokeleba floribunda 
Diplokeleba herzogii

References

Sapindaceae
Sapindaceae genera
Taxa named by N. E. Brown